Anna Elżbieta Rechnio (born 11 December 1977) is a Polish former competitive figure skater. She is a three-time Polish national champion who competed at two Winter Olympics.

Personal life 
Anna Elżbieta Rechnio was born 11 December 1977 in Warsaw.She is married to a former Russian skater; Alexei Fedoseev. They have a daughter; Maria (born 2010).

Career 
Rechnio began skating in 1984. Early in her career, she was coached by Barbara Kossowska and Anna Hunkiewicz.

In the 1993–94 season, Rechnio won her first senior national title. In January 1994, she placed 7th at the European Championships in Copenhagen, Denmark. The following month, she competed at her first Winter Olympics. Ranked ninth in the short program and 12th in the free skate, she finished tenth overall in Lillehammer, Norway. Concluding her season, she finished 15th in March at the 1994 World Championships in Chiba, Japan, having ranked 7th in her qualifying group, 9th in the short, and 17th in the free.

Rechnio also won the Polish Figure Skating Championships in 1997 and 1998. She placed 19th at the 1998 Winter Olympics in Nagano, Japan.

Rechnio competed at five World Championships, achieving her highest placement, 5th, in 1998. She also competed at six European Championships — her best placement was 7th in 1994.

In the 1999–2000 season, Rechnio was coached by Miroslawa Brajczewska in Warsaw. After retiring from competition, she began working as a coach.

Programs

Results
GP: Champions Series / Grand Prix

References

1977 births
Living people
Figure skaters at the 1994 Winter Olympics
Figure skaters at the 1998 Winter Olympics
Polish female single skaters
Olympic figure skaters of Poland
Figure skaters from Warsaw
Competitors at the 1998 Goodwill Games